Shervedan (also Romanized as Shervedān; also known as Shervehdān and Shīrvedān) is a village in Golestan Rural District, in the Central District of Falavarjan County, Isfahan Province, Iran. At the 2006 census, its population was 3,114, in 808 families.

References 

Populated places in Falavarjan County